Leslie Ernest Devonshire (13 June 1926 – 19 December 2012) was an English professional footballer who made 127 appearances in The Football League for Chester and Crystal Palace between 1950 and 1955. His son, Alan Devonshire, was capped by England.

Playing career
Devonshire played as a winger and began his career with Queens Park Rangers and then Brentford without making league appearances for either. After a spell with non-league Wealdstone, Devonshire joined Football League Third Division North side Chester in time for the 1950–51 season. Devonshire missed just two first-team games during the campaign for Chester, marking his home debut with a goal in a 3–1 win over Oldham Athletic on 23 August 1950.

He then returned south and joined Crystal Palace, where he spent four years involved in the first-team. This was followed by a spell playing for non-league sides Margate and Canterbury City until 1960.

Devonshire lived in Perivale, Middlesex in his last years.  He died on 19 December 2012, leaving 11 grandchildren.

External links
Margate FC History profile

References

1926 births
2012 deaths
English footballers
Association football wingers
English Football League players
Queens Park Rangers F.C. players
Brentford F.C. players
Wealdstone F.C. players
Chester City F.C. players
Crystal Palace F.C. players
Margate F.C. players
Canterbury City F.C. players